George Junior Republic is an all-boys institution in western Pennsylvania, in the vicinity of Grove City.  It is one of the nation's largest private non-profit residential treatment facilities. George Junior Republic houses, schools, and disciplines 500 high school-aged boys from troubled backgrounds. George Junior Republic uses a behavior/education treatment model and provides psychological testing, psychiatric evaluation, education, vocational training, recreation and athletics to delinquent youth. Special needs programs and drug and alcohol diagnosis/treatment areas are also provided. The school is characterized by its many cottages that house the boys. All the houses are modern and they give the campus the appearance of an upper-class housing development.

Founding 

The George Junior Republic in Grove City was founded by American philanthropist William Reuben George in 1909.  The original George Junior Republic was founded in Freeville, New York, in 1895 as a self-governing colony requiring payment in labor for all that they received. "The George Junior Republic was run like a small village where the residents where engaged in self-supporting enterprizes and administered their own laws." In 1910 George was forced to sever ties with the Freeville Junior Republic and make his home elsewhere after allegations of misconduct arose regarding his treatment of female citizens. After leaving direct supervision of the Freeville Republic, George became the director of the National Association of Junior Republics. In 1914 he was accused of misconduct in a case involving molestation of three girls at Freeville. The judges strongly condemned his "theory" of paternalism which allowed him to treat women and citizens of the republic "without regard to the rules and usages of common life and civilized society."

Brief description of the life of an interned boy at the GJR in late 1949-1951
In the late 1940s and well into 1951, the GJR cottages were supervised by husband and wife teams referred to by all as cottage parents and called "Aunt" and "Uncle". The GJR was probably 85% self-sufficient. There was the dairy, tailor shop, barber shop, blacksmith shop and the gardens raising much of the fruit and vegetables for the institution. During this period there were 3-4 major cottages housing from 90 to 120 boys. The housing consisted of 3-4 floors. Usually the basement was where the boys remained when not outside working. The basement also provided for showers and individual lockers for each boy. The main floor was primarily the kitchen and dining room. A small TV room was also provided for those boys that qualified for TV privileges. Uncle Milty was the most popular show of the time. The third floor consisted of a bedroom for the cottage parents and several small individual bedrooms, each housing four specially privileged boys. The top floor was totally open, much like a military barracks. WWII metal bunk beds were stacked two high throughout the entire floor.

The normal daily routine was to be up at 6:30 a.m. and down into the basement to take care of individual hygiene, then eat breakfast and off to work detail or school. Most of the boys who qualified were sent to the local high school in Grove City. When they returned from school, they went to whatever work area they were assigned. After supper was study time for those who attended school. Saturday morning was also a work period but Saturday afternoons were usually reserved for a movie in the gymnasium. Sunday was visitors' day when family members could come and spend the entire afternoon.

See also 
 Reform school
 Youth detention center

References 
 "The Junior Republic; Its History and Ideals" by William R. George

Information for George Junior Republic 
 George Junior Republic in Grove City, PA
 Discussion of the founding of the original George Junior Republic in New York by founder. Has some interesting insights into what life was like at the institution between its founding circa 1895 and 1908. "The Junior Republic; Its History and Ideals" by William R. George
 1907 thesis which also studies the original George Junior Republic in New York "THE YOUNG MALEFACTOR; A STUDY IN JUVENILE DELINQUENCY ITS CAUSES AND TREATMENT" BY THOMAS TRAVIS, PH.D.
 "Preventive Treatment of Neglected Children" By Hastings Hornell Hart - Chapter 4 is on the George Junior Republic.
 Article published August 25, 1895, about the Original George Junior Republic during its first summer. CAMP OF BOYS AND GIRLS; Industrial Farm in Tompkins County for City Children. CONDUCTED BY WILLIAM R. GEORGE Influences for Good Which Surround the Citizens of This Miniature Republic -- Have Their Own Congress and Police.
 Article published November 18, 1899, about the Original George Junior Republic in New York GEORGE JUNIOR REPUBLIC.; Dr. Van Dyke and ex-Secretary Fairchild Address the Association at Brick Presbyterian Church.
 Article published October 9, 1911, about the attempted escape and eloping of a male and female ward at the Grove City George Junior Republic. BOY JUDGE IN JAIL.; And Girl Banished from George Junior Republic.
 Article published December 1, 2007
"George Junior Republic: Building Better Boys" By Eric Slack

 Collection contains extensive correspondence and other materials concerning William R. George and the founding of the George Junior Republic, the evolution of the Republic and its part in educational reform in the early twentieth century; and the establishment of other Junior Republics in the United States
George (William R.) family papers, 1750-1989.

 Letters from Susan Dixwell Miller (Mrs. Gerrit Smith Miller) concerning Miss Cross' settlement house work for women in Brooklyn; letters, notes, and reminiscences concerning the beginnings of the George Junior Republic in Freeville, New York; and family letters and printed items.
Kitchelt, Florence Ledyard Cross papers, 1896-1954.

External links 
 GJR alumni

Private high schools in Pennsylvania
Juvenile detention centers in the United States
Buildings and structures in Mercer County, Pennsylvania
Schools in Mercer County, Pennsylvania
1909 establishments in New York (state)